Cédric Klapisch (born 4 September 1961) is a French film director, screenwriter and producer.

Life and career
Klapisch was born in Neuilly-sur-Seine, Hauts-de-Seine. He is from a Jewish family; his maternal grandparents were deported to Auschwitz. He studied cinema at the University of Paris III: Sorbonne Nouvelle as well as at the University of Paris VIII. He was rejected on two occasions by the French film school IDHEC (Institut des hautes études cinématographiques), now known as La fémis.  He later attended the film school at New York University from 1983 to 1985. During the 1980s, he started to shoot short films such as In transit or Ce qui me meut. He subsequently worked as a scriptwriter and he became a director for feature films. He has also directed a nature documentary for French television.

In 1992, Klapisch shot his first feature film, Riens du tout. A year later, a TV channel asked him to make a film about high school life, set in 1975, Le péril jeune.  The film had a very small budget and featured Romain Duris and Vincent Elbaz, who would become two of his favourite actors.  Due to its success when broadcast on TV, the film was released in the theaters two years later.  During the 1990s, Klapisch made three short films to encourage the use of condoms in combatting AIDS: La chambre, Le Poisson Rouge and Le Ramoneur des Lilas.

In 1996, Klapisch gained greater international recognition after he directed two divergent films, Chacun cherche son chat (When the Cat's Away), and an adaptation of the French theatre comedy Un air de famille.  Agnès Jaoui and Jean-Pierre Bacri, the two scriptwriters and main actors, asked him to adapt the play into a film.  The film received César Awards for the script and for the female and male supporting roles, Catherine Frot and Jean-Pierre Daroussin.  His next film, Peut-être (Maybe), from 1999, featured Jean-Paul Belmondo, Duris and Elbaz.

Klapisch's next film, Ni pour, ni contre (bien au contraire), had its production delayed for 4 months. During this period, he devised a new, low-budget product, which became L'Auberge Espagnole (The Spanish Apartment). Shot in Spain, this film became his greatest box-office success, and he planned three parts to what became known as his Spanish Apartment Trilogy. In 2005, he filmed a sequel to L'Auberge Espagnole, Les Poupées Russes (Russian Dolls), with many of the same actors from L'Auberge Espagnole.  His film Paris was released in February 2008, and Ma part du gâteau in 2011. In 2012, Klapisch filmed Casse-tête chinois (Chinese Puzzle). This sequel to Les Poupées Russes was released in 2013.

Filmography

References

External links

Cédric Klapisch official website

1961 births
Living people
People from Neuilly-sur-Seine
French film directors
French film producers
20th-century French Jews
French male screenwriters
French screenwriters
Best Director Lumières Award winners
Paris 8 University Vincennes-Saint-Denis alumni
Sorbonne Nouvelle University Paris 3 alumni